Sakko may refer to:

 Sakko (clothing) (also Sacco), a type of jacket
 Sakkō, a Japanese hairstyle